Unconditional Love is a one-off British crime drama television film that was broadcast on 20 January 2003. Written by Chris Lang, the production starred Robson Green, Joe Absolom, Sarah Parish and Timothy Krause, and follows the story of a couple whose four-year-old son is kidnapped, and his captor demands that they commit a series of crimes in order to secure his safe return. The drama was directed by Ferdinand Fairfax and produced by Mark Pybus.

Plot
Pete (Robson Green) & Lydia Gray (Sarah Parish) are out celebrating their son Max (Timothy Krause)'s fourth birthday, when they become involved in one of every parent's worst nightmares; as Max is snatched by embittered Benjamin Cain (Joe Absolom), his half-brother, who since his birth in 1982, has endured various degrees of abuse, perversion, abandonment, addiction and betrayal. He now has concocted a plan to gain revenge on his abusers and his so-called loving birth parent, who gave him up for adoption, leaving him to the mercy of those who exploited the system, just so they could abuse their positions of power and indulge in their perverted pleasures of pedophilia.

Cast
 Robson Green as Pete Gray
 Sarah Parish as Lydia Gray
 Joe Absolom as Benjamin Cain
 Timothy Krause as Max Gray
 Peter Capaldi as D.I. Terry Machin
 Kaye Wragg as D.S. Hayley Greene
 Shaun Parkes as D.S. Steve Webber
 Howard Ward as Mike Farley
 Ross Gurney-Randall as Kelly
 Anatol Yusef as the Security Guard
 Jean Trend as the Nursery Teacher
 Valerie Mikita as the Singer

References

External links

ITV television dramas
2003 films